The Apostolic Vicariate of Bontoc-Lagawe (in Latin: Vicariatus Apostolicus Bontocensis-Lagavensis) is a Latin Church missionary ecclesiastical jurisdiction or apostolic vicariate of the Catholic Church in the Philippines.

It is directly exempt the Holy See, not part of any ecclesiastical province, and directly under the jurisdiction of the Pope who exercises authority through the bishop-in-charge known as the Vicar Apostolic. For the purpose of apostolic cooperation, usually grouped with the Archdiocese of Nueva Segovia. It also has a working partnership with the Apostolic Vicariate of Tabuk and the Diocese of Baguio, both in the Cordilleras, to coordinate Catholic missions among the Igorot tribes. The Apostolic Vicariate operates a liaison office in the compound of the Baguio Cathedral.

On 6 May 2015, Pope Francis appointed Valentin Dimoc as its fifth bishop, after the vicariate was without bishop for three years.

Territory
The apostolic vicariate comprises the two civil provinces of Ifugao and Mountain Province. Based on NSO record of 2007, there are about 190,000 Catholics in the jurisdiction. The seat of the vicariate is the town of Bontoc, where the Santa Rita of Cascia Cathedral and the vicarial chancery, known as the Teng-ab Pastoral Complex, are located. The territory is divided into 21 parishes.

History
Records from Santa Rita Parish of Bontoc reveal that the first baptism held in Bontoc was administered by Augustinian Father Jose Iglesia on 28 November 1893. Spanish missionaries however abandoned the Bontoc Mission sometime in 1898. After a lull for almost a decade, a group of Belgian CICM missionaries led by Father Constance Jurgens and Jules Sepulchre arrived in Bontoc in time to celebrate a midnight mass on 24 December 1907

On 10 June 1948, Pope Pius XII established the Apostolic Vicariate of the Mountain Province, formerly known as the Apostolic Prefecture of the Montañosa. Eleven days after, on 21 June, Vatican appointed the Belgian missionary, Bishop William Brasseur, CICM as its first Vicar Apostolic.

The apostolic vicariate was erected on 6 July 1992 with the apostolic constitution Ad aptius in Insulis Philippinis of Pope John Paul II. Bontoc-Lagawe was one among the three vicariates created by dividing the old Vicariate of Montañosa into three: the Vicariates of Baguio (elevated into a diocese in 2004), Tabuk and Bontoc-Lagawe.

Assisting the Vicar Apostolic in the governance of pastoral welfare is the Vicariate Mission Council.  All members of the presbyterium form this council which meets regularly every quarter.  However, it is the prerogative of the Vicar Apostolic to convene the mission council as the need arises.

Apostolic Vicars

See also 
Roman Catholicism in Philippines

References

Christian organizations established in 1992
Bontoc-Lagawe
Religion in Mountain Province
Religion in Ifugao